Mimikry is a Swedish punk rock band established by singer Hjalmar "Hjalle" Östman and drummer Jonas "Heavy" Stentäpp both coming from the Gagnef region west of Sweden. Besides Mimikry with its 8 albums to date, Hjalle and Heavy had an important duo project and had three further albums in their name Hjalle och Heavy, after huge popularity through the television series På rymmen. Heavy was also involved in metal band Dökött.

Beginnings

Hjalle och Heavy (1998)

The two principal members Hjalle (Hjalmar Östman, born 1976 in Floda, Gagnef Municipality) and Heavy (Jonas Stentäpp, born 1975 in Björbo, Gagnef Municipality) met each other very early on when they both competed in På rymmen (a Swedish version of Wanted) on TV4, which had an average of 1.7 million viewers.

Forming the duo Hjalle och Heavy, the band released three albums in 1998. The first was På rymmen, which reached the top of the charts for 4 weeks with 80,000 copies sold. The 16-track album included a mix of songs produced as Hjalle och Heavy, Mimikry, and Dökött (Stentäpp's metal band trio). The follow-up album 2:a säsongen sold 120,000 copies and also reached the top of the charts.

They engaged on a national tour of Sweden accompanied by their bands Mimikry and Dökött (Heavy's  Björbo metal band with Peter "Pekka" Hindén and Andreas "Ryttarn" Ryttare). The third album in 1998 was Dunder, which sold 40,000 copies and was based on the tour. After the third album, subsequent efforts by the duo were focused on Mimikry.

Career as Mimikry
The band Mimikry formed in 1993 released its debut album Automatiskt after the huge success and popularity of Hjalle och Heavy. Mimikry has released 9 albums to date.

Current members
 Hjalmar "Hjalle" Östman – lead vocals (1993–present)
 Johan Åsberg – guitar (1993–present)
 Mia Mästerbo – bass, backing vocals (1997–present)
 Jonas "Heavy" Stentäpp – drums (1993–present)
 Anders "Apan" Andersson – guitar, backing vocals (2005–2010, 2023-present)

Former members
 Jonas Nyberg – bass (1993-1997)
 Anders Brandström – guitar, backing vocals (2011–2023)

Discography

As Hjalle och Heavy

As Mimikry

EPs
2011: Jag blöder lika mycket som du

DVDs
2006: Scream for me Finnåker / Lika bra som Iron Maiden
2007: Bullrigt, hembränt och live!

Singles / Videography
(Selective)
2000: "500 mil"
2004: "En flicka som är stark"
2006: "Kom och dansa lite"
2008: "Alderland"
2008: "Min sång"
2010: "Borgarsvin"
2014: "Röda Fanor"

References

External links
Official website

Swedish punk rock groups